The Croix de fer (2,343 m) is a mountain of the Mont Blanc Massif, overlooking Trient in the canton of Valais. It is located north of the Tête de Balme and L'Arolette and it is the culminating point of the group between the Col des Montets and the Col de Balme.

References

External links
 Croix de Fer on Hikr

Mountains of the Alps
Mountains of Valais
Mountains of Switzerland
Two-thousanders of Switzerland